The Alte Synagoge (Old Synagogue) in Erfurt, Germany, is one of the best preserved medieval synagogues in Europe, its oldest parts dating back to the late 11th century. Most parts of the building date from around 1250–1320. It is thought to be the oldest synagogue building intact to its roof still standing in Europe and the world.

Since 2009 it has been used as a museum of local Jewish history. It houses the Erfurt Treasure, a hoard of medieval coins, goldsmiths' work and jewellery found in 1998. It also has facsimiles of the Erfurt Hebrew Manuscripts, an important collection of 12th-14th century religious texts that belonged to the medieval Jewish community of Erfurt.

The Historic Synagogues of Europe project, carried out by the Center for Jewish Art at the Hebrew University of Jerusalem, has given the Old Synagogue, Erfurt its highest level of significance rating: 4 (International) – "The building is of outstanding architectural, urban or historical importance. It has unique features and/or is especially influential internationally as an architectural pattern."

In 2015 it was proposed as a UNESCO World Heritage Site.

History and Preservation

The oldest parts of the building have been dated by dendrochronology to 1094. There was a second construction phase in the 12th century, from which part of the western wall, with a sandstone double-arched window, has been preserved.

Around 1270, a larger synagogue incorporating parts of the earlier building was constructed. The western façade, with five lancet windows and a large rosette window, dates from this time. In the early 1300s, it was extended and another storey was added.

After the Erfurt Massacre of 1349, in which the Jewish population was murdered and expelled from the city, the synagogue was damaged. The city of Erfurt took ownership of the building and later sold it to a local merchant. It was converted into a warehouse and a vaulted cellar was built underneath. The alterations considerably changed the interior of the building. For the next 500 years it was used for storing goods.

From the 19th century, the building had various uses and had at different periods a ballroom, a restaurant and even two bowling alleys. These changes, and changes to the surrounding buildings, meant that the Old Synagogue, which is on a back lot down a narrow alleyway, was largely forgotten about. Its history wasn't recognised, which helped to protect it during the German period.

It was not until the late 1980s that interest was awakened in the old building. The architectural historian Elmar Altwasser began to research it in 1992. Erfurt City Council bought the property in 1998 and extensively researched and conserved it.

"During the conservation, great emphasis was put on the preservation of all traces of use: those dating from synagogal use as well as those from later alterations. Owing to this careful conservation and restoration, medieval as well as younger building phases are still easy to perceive." Permanent Delegation of Germany to UNESCO (2015) Old synagogue and Mikveh in Erfurt 

In 2007 a rare and particularly well-preserved Jewish ritual bath, a Mikveh, dating from c.1250 was discovered by archeologists not far from the Old Synagogue, near Erfurt's Krämerbrücke (Merchants' Bridge). The mikveh has been accessible to visitors on guided tours since September 2011.

In 2015 the Old Synagogue, Mikveh and the 'Stone House', a secular building from c.1250 in Erfurt's medieval city centre which had Jewish owners, were together nominated as a World Heritage Site. This has been tentatively listed but a final decision has not yet been made.

Museum

The Old Synagogue was opened as a museum on 27 October 2009.

The museum permanently houses the Erfurt Treasure, a hoard of 3141 silver coins, weighing , and over 700 pieces of goldsmiths' work and jewellery that is thought to have belonged to Jews who hid them at the time of the Erfurt massacre in 1349. The collection, which weighs almost  in total, was found in 1998 in the wall of a house at Michaelisstraße 43, in a medieval Jewish neighbourhood, near the Synagogue. The treasure has been exhibited in Berlin, Paris, London, New York and Tel Aviv.

It also displays facsimiles of the Erfurt Hebrew Manuscripts, a collection of significant religious texts dating from the 12th-14th century. They came into the possession of Erfurt City Council after the Erfurt Massacre, and in the late 17th century ended up in the   library of the Lutheran Evangelical Ministry, at Erfurt's former Augustinian Monastery. The Ministry sold them to the Royal Library in Berlin, the present day Berlin State Library, in 1880, where the originals are now kept.

Erfurt Tosefta
One of the Erfurt Manuscripts is the Tosefta, part of a compilation of oral law, or oral Torah, attributed to Jewish scholars called tannaim, who mostly lived in Palestine from about the year 0 CE until c. 200 CE (0 – 200 AD). Not all scholars agree, but it is generally thought to provide interpretation of unclear sections of the Mishnah, Judaism's primary book of Jewish legal theory.

Tosefta were rarely copied, and the Erfurt Tosefta, from the 12th century, is the oldest of only three known Tosefta manuscripts. The other two are the Vienna Tosefta, late 13th century, held by the Austrian National Library and the London Tosefta, 15th century, held by the British Library.

Moses Samuel Zuckermandl (also Zuckermandel) was the first to point out the importance of the Erfurt Tosefta in his seminal study on it published, in German, in 1876.

Other synagogues in Erfurt

The Kleine Synagoge (Small Synagogue) was built in 1840 and was used until 1884.  It was restored in 1998 and it is now used as an events venue. The building features a classically influenced façade and interior.

In 1884 the community constructed the Große Synagoge (Great Synagogue), a magnificent Moorish Revival building.  It was destroyed in the Nazi Kristallnacht riots on the night of 9–10 November 1938.

In 1947 the site of the Great Synagogue, which had been confiscated by the Nazis, was returned to the Jewish community by Erfurt City Council. The Neue Synagoge (New Synagogue), which was built on the site, opened on 31 August 1952. The new building was funded by the GDR government and it was the only completely new synagogue ever built in the country.

It is the New Synagogue which is used for worship by the present-day Jewish community in Erfurt; it was set on fire by a group of neo-Nazis in April 2000

See also
 History of the Jews in Germany
 Oldest synagogues in the world

References

External links
 Erfurt Tourismus. Old Synagogue and Erfurt Treasure
 Visit Thuringia. Old Synagogue

World Heritage Tentative List
Museums in Erfurt
Heritage sites in Thuringia
Romanesque and Gothic synagogues
11th-century synagogues
13th-century synagogues
Synagogues preserved as museums
Jewish museums in Germany
Restored and conserved buildings
Former synagogues in Germany
Medieval German architecture
Jewish German history
Medieval Jewish history
Archaeological discoveries in Germany
2007 archaeological discoveries